Alina Pușcău (born 17 November 1981) is a Romanian model, actress and singer. She started modeling after she was crowned the winner of the 1998 Elite Model Look. She has modeled for Victoria's Secret, GAP, JCPenney and Pepe Jeans. She has appeared on the cover of Playboy and released a debut single and music video titled "When You Leave (Numa Numa)", which is a cover of the English version of "Dragostea Din Tei".

Discography

Studio albums

Singles

Music videos

Filmography

References

External links 

 

Living people
Romanian female models
1981 births